George Thoirs Geddes Bertram (2 September 1908 – 1972) was a Scottish footballer who featured mainly for Airdrieonians. He signed for the Diamonds as a teenager from the junior leagues in 1927, having a difficult task of not only finding a role in the strong side of the 1920s which challenged consistently for the Scottish Football League title and won the Scottish Cup in 1924, but also specifically replacing Bob McPhail, the team's inside left who had moved on to Rangers.

He became an increasingly important member of the team (although collectively they were unable to match the standards set earlier in the period), moving to outside left after the departure of Jimmy Somerville in 1930. In the 1931–32 season, his contribution was 41 league and cup appearances (including the semi-final loss to Kilmarnock) and seven goals, plus a selection for the Scottish Football League XI, but he played only six times in the following campaign before his career was halted by a broken leg, and he was released by Airdrie before its end.

Short spells with few appearances followed at top-tier sides Hamilton Academical, Partick Thistle and Queen of the South, then a year at second-level King's Park where he featured slightly more often, but he then dropped out of senior football aged 28.

References

1908 births
1972 deaths
People from Govan
Scottish footballers
Footballers from Glasgow
Association football inside forwards
Petershill F.C. players
Scottish Junior Football Association players
Airdrieonians F.C. (1878) players
Partick Thistle F.C. players
Hamilton Academical F.C. players
Queen of the South F.C. players
King's Park F.C. players
Scottish Football League players
Scottish Football League representative players
Association football outside forwards